Konstanty Mackiewicz (2 November 1894 – 30 September 1985) was a Polish painter. His work was part of the painting event in the art competition at the 1936 Summer Olympics.

References

1894 births
1985 deaths
20th-century Polish painters
20th-century Polish male artists
Olympic competitors in art competitions
People from Brest Region
Polish male painters